Adobe ImageReady is a discontinued bitmap graphics editor that was shipped with Adobe Photoshop for six years. It was available for Windows, Classic Mac OS and Mac OS X from 1998 to 2007. ImageReady was designed for web development and closely interacted with Photoshop.

Function 
ImageReady was designed for web development rather than effects-intensive photo manipulation. To that end, ImageReady has specialized features such as animated GIF creation, image compression optimization, image slicing, adding rollover effects, and HTML generation.

Photoshop versions with which ImageReady was released have an "Edit in ImageReady" button that enables editing of image directly in ImageReady. ImageReady, in turn, has an "Edit in Photoshop" button.

ImageReady has strong resemblances to Photoshop; it can even use the same set of Photoshop filters. One set of tools that does not resemble the Photoshop tools, however, is the Image Map set of tools, indicated by a shape or arrow with a hand that varied depending upon the version.  This toolbox has several features not found in Photoshop, including:
 Toggle Image Map Visibility and Toggle Slice Visibility tools: toggle between showing and hiding image maps and slices, respectively
 Export Animation Frames as Files option: saves all or specified frames for an alternate use, e.g., to e-mail slides for review
 Preview Document tool: provides a preview of rollover effects in ImageReady rather than previewing them in a browser
 Preview in Default Browser tool: previews the image in a browser, including any rollover or animation effects
 Edit in Photoshop button: opens the current image in Photoshop

History
Adobe ImageReady 1.0 was released in July 1998 as a standalone application. Version 2.0 was packaged with Photoshop 5.5, and the program was included with Photoshop through version 9.0 (CS2). Starting with Photoshop 7.0, Adobe changed the version numbers of ImageReady to match.

With the release of the Creative Suite 3, ImageReady was discontinued. According to Adobe, ImageReady's most popular features were merged into Photoshop. (Even before discontinuation, some of ImageReady's web optimization functionality could be found in Photoshop's Save For Web & Devices tool.) Around the same time, Adobe purchased rival software developer Macromedia, whose application Fireworks had been a competitor to ImageReady.

References

Adobe Photoshop
Graphics software
ImageReady
Raster graphics editors
C++ software
ImageReady
1998 software
Windows graphics-related software
MacOS software